IndiaFirst Life Insurance Company is a joint venture of India's public sector banks (Bank of Baroda (. The company has paid-up share capital of  663 crore.

It was incorporated in November 2009 and is headquartered in Mumbai. It recorded more than INR 2 billion in turnover in just four and a half months since the insurance company became operational.

Business model
IndiaFirst Life Insurance follows the "Bancassurance" (Bank Insurance Model) which uses the existing customer base of the promoter banks. As of June 2021, the company has more than 3100 employees.

Financials
The company ended FY20 with INR 3,360 crore worth of total premiums collected and AUM of Rs 14,723 crore. The company has had a CAGR of 40% in the last five years in Individual New Business APE, as compared to Life Insurance Industry growth of 12% CAGR during the same period. The life insurance company has reported a 25% growth in individual New Business (NB) Annual Premium Equivalent (APE) in Financial Year (FY) 2019-20. IndiaFirst Life grew at 5.2 times the private industry growth rate of 5% and at 4.0 times the overall industry growth rate of 6% (including LIC). For the month of March 2020, IndiaFirst Life ranked 10th in the private sector in Individual NB APE and ranked 12th in the private sector for FY 2020. It also observed a claim settlement ratio of 98.56%, supported over 13800 families and paid claims in excess of INR 346.82 crore. Paid group claims in excess of INR 1056.5 crores (includes PMJJBY).

Sale of stake
In June 2018, one of the original founders, Legal & General, sold its stake to private equity firm, Warburg Pincus for Rs 7.1 Billion. Other stakeholders include General Atlantic, Ergo International AG, Manulife Financial Corp, and Canadian billionaire, Prem Watsa’s Fairfax. Legal & General sold its stake as it was restructuring its business in the UK and the US markets. In November 2018, the Insurance Regulatory and Development Authority gave its in-principle approval to IndiaFirst Life Insurance for the stake sale from Legal & General to Warburg Pincus. In February 2019, another promoter, Andhra Bank, announced plans to sell its 30% stake for ₹ 9 Billion.

History
IndiaFirst Life Insurance was incorporated by Bank of Baroda, Andhra Bank (now Union Bank of India), and Legal & General in 2009. Legal & General later sold its stake to Carmel Point Investment India Private Limited, a corporation incorporated under the laws of Mauritius and owned by private equity funds managed by Warburg Pincus LLC.

This company was the first one in the history of IndiaFirst Life Insurance, wherein a private equity fund has taken an interest in a life insurance company.

In April 2020, a merger took place between Andhra Bank with the Union Bank of India. It changed the shareholding pattern of IndiaFirst Life Insurance to Bank of Baroda (44%), Union Bank of India (30%) and Carmel Point Investments India Private Limited (26%).

Management
The MD & CEO of the company is R. M. Vishakha and Deputy CEO is Rushabh Gandhi.

Products
IndiaFirst Life offers a diverse series of 31 need-based products, catering to varied customer segments, leveraging multiple distribution capabilities, and augmenting various investment options.

References

Life insurance companies of India
Bank of Baroda
Financial services companies established in 2009
Financial services companies based in Mumbai
Warburg Pincus companies
Indian companies established in 2009
2009 establishments in Maharashtra